Dramocles: An Intergalactic Soap Opera is a novel by Robert Sheckley published in 1983.

Plot summary
Dramocles: An Intergalactic Soap Opera is a novel in which King Dramocles of Glorn tries to fulfill his unknown Destiny using notes that he had forgotten that he sent to himself.

Reception
Dave Langford reviewed Dramocles: An Intergalactic Soap Opera for White Dwarf #69, and stated that "Dramocles has hilarious scenes, like the completely irrelevant one in which minor characters try to gain narrative security by establish a sub-plot of their own; but overall it reads as though Sheckley was desperately making it up as he went along. Pretty good by some standards; insubstantial by Sheckley's own."

Reviews
Review by Faren Miller (1983) in Locus, #269 June 1983
Review by John Clute (1984) in Foundation, #30 March 1984
Review by Tom Easton (1984) in Analog Science Fiction/Science Fact, May 1984
Review by Brian Stableford (1984) in Fantasy Review, November 1984

References

1983 novels